Angelos Tsamis (alternate spelling: Aggelos) (born October 2, 1981) is a Greek professional basketball player for Mykonos of the Greek 3rd division. Born in Kato Achaia, Greece, he is a 1.92 m (6 ft 3  in) tall shooting guard.

Professional career
Tsamis won the Greek 2nd Division championship with Olympias Patras in 2006. He also won the French Super Cup title with Limoges in 2012.

Awards and accomplishments
 Greek 2nd Division: Champion (2006)
 French Super Cup: Winner (2012)

External links
FIBA Europe Profile
Eurobasket.com Profile
Greek Basket League Profile 
Greek Basket League Profile 
French League Profile 
Draftexpress.com Profile

1981 births
Living people
AEK B.C. players
Greek men's basketball players
Holargos B.C. players
Kolossos Rodou B.C. players
Limoges CSP players
Olympias Patras B.C. players
Promitheas Patras B.C. players
Shooting guards
People from Achaea